The 2010 Hawaii Warriors football team represented the University of Hawaii at Manoa in the 2010 college football season. The Warriors, led by third-year head coach Greg McMackin, were members of the Western Athletic Conference (WAC) and played their home games at Aloha Stadium in Halawa, Hawaii. They finished the season 10–4, 7–1 in WAC play to claim a share of the WAC championship with Boise State and Nevada. They were invited to the Hawaii Bowl where they were defeated by Tulsa, 62–35.

Schedule

Rankings

Notable players
 Bryant Moniz
 Greg Salas
 Alex Green - Achieved school record rushing yard in a single game, 327 against NMSU

NFL Draft
3rd Round, 97th Overall Pick by the Green Bay Packers—Sr. RB Alex Green

4th Round, 112th Overall Pick by the St. Louis Rams—Sr. WR Greg Salas

5th Round, 132nd Overall Pick by the Carolina Panthers—Sr. WR Kealoha Pilares

References

Hawaii
Hawaii Rainbow Warriors football seasons
Western Athletic Conference football champion seasons
Hawaii Warriors football